Nikolaus Leopold Joseph Maria zu Salm-Salm (July 18, 1838 – February 16, 1908) was a German nobleman with an interest in natural history. He was the sixth prince of Salm-Salm from 1886 to 1908 and as Lord of Anholt he was a hereditary member of the Prussian House of Lords from 1888 to 1908. He built a park at his castle in Anholt, with a miniature Lake Lucerne. He controlled coal mining rights in the region.

Leopold zu Salm-Salm was the eldest son of Alfred Konstantin zu Salm-Salm and Auguste Adelheid Emanuele Constanze von Croÿ (1815–1886) daughter of Ferdinand Victor Philippe von Croÿ (1791–1865). He was privately educated and had an interest in natural history. He began to observe birds in the region and also made a collection of specimens. He also took an interest in crustaceans. He also took an interest in horses and was involved in their breeding. In 1893, he married Eleonore Leopoldine Aloysia von Croÿ (May 13, 1855 – May 27, 1903), daughter of Alexis Wilhelm Zephyrinus Victor von Croÿ (1825–1898) and Franziska Maria Johanna Carolina Aloysia (1833–1908). The spent their honeymoon in Switzerland and on returning he began to construct a Swiss style chalet in his castle and the grounds included a miniature Lake Lucerne.

Owning the rights to all mineral resources in the Principality of Salm, he began to mine coal. The Trier mining company continued after his death and several of the shafts were named after Leopold.  

He died childless and was succeeded by his younger brother. Leopold zu Salm-Salm's large collection of crustaceans and bird specimens went to the Westphalian Provincial Museum for Natural History in Münster.

References 

German nobility
German natural history collectors
German naturalists